Keiser University – College of Golf is located in West Palm Beach, Florida, United States. The College of Golf at Keiser University offers an Associate of Science Degree in Golf Management and a Bachelor's Degree in Golf Management.

Campus 

The Keiser University College of Golf campus consists of 1500+ square feet of indoor golf instructional space that houses state-of-the-practice technology, including video systems, launch monitors, a 3D swing analysis system, and more. Upon graduation, students will have earned credits toward those required for PGA membership.

Accreditation 
Keiser University is accredited by the Commission on Colleges of the Southern Association of Colleges and Schools (SACS) to award certificates and degrees at the associate, bachelors, masters, and doctoral levels.

References

External links 
 

Private universities and colleges in Florida
Universities and colleges accredited by the Southern Association of Colleges and Schools
Education in St. Lucie County, Florida
Buildings and structures in St. Lucie County, Florida
Keiser University